Cnemacantha is a genus of flies belonging to the family Lauxaniidae.

The genus was first described by Macquart in 1835.

The species of this genus are found in Europe.

Species:
 Cnemacantha muscaria (Fallen, 1823)

References

Lauxaniidae
Taxa named by Pierre-Justin-Marie Macquart